Assume Form is the fourth studio album by English singer-songwriter and producer James Blake. It was released on 18 January 2019 by Polydor Records. Critics described the album as having a more upbeat sound than Blake's prior work, especially his previous album, The Colour In Anything (2016). The album, which contains elements of electropop, hip hop, and R&B, features guest vocal appearances by Travis Scott, Moses Sumney, Rosalía, and André 3000, as well as contributions from producer Metro Boomin.

The lead single "Don't Miss It" was released on 4 June 2018 and two further singles, "Mile High" and "Lullaby for My Insomniac" followed in January. Upon the album's release, Assume Form received praise from critics for its more upbeat sound, romanticism and production. The album was nominated for Best Alternative Music Album at the 62nd Annual Grammy Awards.

Background and recording
In 2016, Blake collaborated with Beyoncé on the album Lemonade. Following this, he stated that he "always felt, or at least for a long time, that [his] position in music was to bubble under mainstream [...] [and] be kind of like a musician's musician". Blake subsequently worked with numerous hip hop and electronic artists—including Jay-Z on the album 4:44; Kendrick Lamar on the track "Element"; Mount Kimbie the album Love What Survives; Oneohtrix Point Never on the album Age Of; and Travis Scott on the track "Stop Trying to Be God".

In May 2017, Blake revealed that he had already written new music such as "hip hop things" and "collaborative productions and beats" but added that he was unsure whether they would be stand-alone singles or projects. He booked spontaneous sessions with Rosalía and André 3000, which brought about André 3000's EP Look Ma No Hands, as well as the tracks "Barefoot in the Park" and "Where's the Catch?", both tracks from Assume Form. Blake was inspired to collaborate with Rosalía after hearing her debut record Los ángeles, and stated that he "honestly hadn’t heard anything so vulnerable and raw and devastating in quite a while." He subsequently invited her to the studio and made "two or three things" and added that he "loved the sound of our voices together." He also performed in the studio with Travis Scott after collaborating on his album Astroworld. He described the session as unusual, saying, "[Scott] had just released Astroworld, which is like banger after banger, and then he comes and does this really vulnerable, sweet love song [Mile High]." The recording session with Moses Sumney and Metro Boomin for "Tell Them" was described as a "vulnerable moment" by Blake.

Music and lyrics
Assume Form has been described as a pop and electropop with elements of hip hop and R&B, and as significantly more upbeat than his previous records, numerous publications contrasting it with the "utterly downcast" The Colour In Anything. Blake's vocals range from deeper tones to a falsetto and the record also features manipulated vocals and a "self-choir". Variations on a hip hop beat featured on the track "Can't Believe the Way We Flow", which Blake performed several times in late 2017, appears on various tracks off the record. Its lyrics mainly allude to Blake's relationship with his girlfriend Jameela Jamil and their life in Los Angeles. Blake told Dazed that the album was about his current feelings, referring to his sentiments towards his girlfriend, as a reaction to when online music magazine Pitchfork described Assume Form's lead single "Don't Miss It" as "sad boy music", and explained that "on this record, I'm just talking about how I feel now, and I will continue to write about how I feel, or sometimes I won't talk about how I feel, but I'll fucking damn well choose when I do and when I don't – without feeling like because I'm a man I shouldn't do that." In an interview with Exclaim!, Blake said, "I wanted to try and say the thing I mean, which is hard. It's scary to do that sometimes. I think the fear kept me from doing that before."

Promotion and release
In December 2018, James Blake announced a tour of North America beginning in Atlanta in February 2019 and ending in Los Angeles the following month. People who had purchased tickets for the North America tour also received a copy of his forthcoming album. Later that month, Blake teased new material with American rapper and multi-instrumentalist André 3000 during a show in Brooklyn.

On 3 January 2019, a French Amazon pre-order page of the album surfaced online, including details such as its release date, track listing, and featured artists, thus revealing that the single "Don't Miss It", which was released on 4 June 2018, was a track from the album. However, both "Vincent", released in late 2017, and "If the Car Beside You Moves Ahead", released earlier in 2018 were absent from the track listing. Nevertheless, there had been speculation that the leak was "an elaborate fake".

Soon after, LED and projection billboards appeared in London and New York promoting the album and revealing a URL for assumeform.com. The site featured a short sample of minimal, ambient music, revealed by Shazam to be "Lullaby for My Insomniac", and an animated graphic featuring the album title. A sign in tag and a video asking a series of questions, taken from the lyrics to the title track, were later added to the site. On 10 January, promotional posters for the album appeared on the London Underground, revealing the album' cover art and officially confirming a release date of 18 January 2019 and guest appearances from André 3000, Travis Scott, Moses Sumney, Metro Boomin and Rosalía. Both the track listing and the features were confirmed on Blake's official Instagram account.

On 17 January, only twelve hours prior to the album's release, Blake released the track "Mile High" featuring Travis Scott and Metro Boomin after having premiered it on Zane Lowe's Beats 1 show. Hours later, a third single, "Lullaby for My Insomniac", was released. The track "Barefoot in the Park" was released as a single on 4 April, accompanied by a music video. The song "Mulholland", which is included on the vinyl version of Assume Form, was released on 26 April as a single.

Commercial performance 
Assume Form debuted at number 21 on the Billboard 200 and number one on the Top Dance/Electronic Albums chart in the United States with 22,000 equivalent album units, including 9,000 from traditional album sales. The album became Blake's highest charting album on Billboard, and his third chart-topping album by genre. In addition, all tracks from the album charted on the Hot Dance/Electronic Songs chart. Blake also earned his highest charting album in the United Kingdom, reaching number 6 and selling 6,226 equivalent album units, including 1,344 CD units.

Critical reception

Assume Form was met with favourable reviews from critics, receiving praise for its more upbeat sound, romanticism and production. At Metacritic, which assigns a normalized rating out of 100 to reviews from professional publications, the album received an average score of 80, based on 31 reviews, indicating "generally favorable reviews". Alexis Petridis of The Guardian praised Blake for "adding fresh, noticeably brighter colours to his palette" and wrote that "it is immensely pleasing to witness an artist who seemed to be at a dead end now moving forward." Neil McCormick of The Daily Telegraph gave the album a perfect score, calling it Blake's "most fully-realised album to date" and "dizzyingly romantic". Conversely, Spencer Kornhaber of The Atlantic wrote that though "as a headphones experience, Assume Form does deliver the expected shivers," he concluded that the album's main flaw was "in over-explaining his art".

In a positive A− review, Wren Graves of Consequence of Sound called the album a "remarkable achievement" and commended Blake as "one of the most original songwriters of his generation." Jon Pareles wrote that the album "opens into haunted, rewarding depths" in a positive review for The New York Times. Stereogums James Rettig commended the album's features and also praised its production, writing that though "Blake's songs occasionally bleed together, [...] here he avoids that by grounding each one in these unique twists of form." Tom Connick of NME gave the album the site's first five-star rating of 2019, hailing Blake as "one of the world's greatest producers [...], a brilliant songwriter and emotive lyricist." Helen Brown echoed these sentiments in her review for The Independent, writing that "his trademark intelligence, honesty and pin-drop production remain intact" and described the album as "a bubble of personal bliss in an ocean full of plastic."

Fred Thomas was more reserved in his assessment for AllMusic, stating that "In some ways it's hard not to miss that trademark ache and downcast minimalism" but added that the record "represents artistic development and a strike at emotional vulnerability from a talent who could have tread well-known territory indefinitely" and concluding that "the shifting perspectives of Assume Form are refreshing." Andy Beta in a review for Spin deemed the album "Blake's most coherent statement to date" and wrote that "he doubles down on his melancholy, but also makes room for love." Alex Suskind of Entertainment Weekly wrote in a positive review that "On his new album Assume Form, Blake abandons that piercing despair — though not his emotional vulnerability — by choosing romance over sorrow."

In a more negative review, Philip Sherburne of Pitchfork criticized the album's "suffocating seriousness" for bogging down "genuine moments of levity and love." However, Blake stated in response that he thinks "they might still be a bit upset that I called them out for their toxic masculinity," referring to when he criticized the site for calling his track "Don't Miss It" "sad boy" music.

Accolades

Track listingNotes  signifies a co-producer
  signifies an additional producerSample credits'
 "Assume Form" contains a sample from "Depression", written by Adam Tench, and performed by Rage Almighty.
 "Barefoot in the Park" contains a sample from "Fíl a Run Ó", performed by Valerie Armstrong, and an interpolation of "Entre Dos Puertos (Alegrías)", written by Paco Ortega and performed by Niña Pastori.
 "Can't Believe the Way We Flow" contains a sample from "It Feels So Good to Be Loved So Bad", written by Teddy Randazzo, and performed by The Manhattans.
 "Where's the Catch?" contains a sample from "Fire", written and performed by Sister Irene O'Connor.
 "I'll Come Too" contains a sample from "La Contessa, Incontro", written and performed by Bruno Nicolai.

Personnel
Credits adapted from official liner notes.

Musicians 

 James Blake – production, vocals
 Dominic Maker – additional production (tracks 1, 3, 5), co-production (tracks 4, 6, 8-11)
 Jameela Jamil – additional arrangement (tracks 1, 6), additional production (tracks 3, 4, 7, 9, 10)
 Travis Scott – featured vocals (track 2)
 Metro Boomin – production (tracks 2, 3)
 Dre Moon – production (tracks 2, 3)
 Wavy – production (track 2)
 Moses Sumney – featured vocals (track 3)
 Allen Ritter – production (track 3)
 Peter Lee Johnson – arrangement (track 3)
 ROSALÍA – additional percussion (track 3), featured vocals (track 5)
 Kalim Patel – additional arrangement (tracks 5, 9)
 Daniel Lopatin – additional production (track 6), additional keyboards (track 8)
 André 3000 – featured vocals (track 8)

Technical 

 Nathan Boddy – mixing, mastering
 James Blake – mixing
 Joshua Smith – recording engineer (tracks 1, 3-11, 13)
 Ethan Stevens – recording engineer (tracks 2, 3, 10)
 Jason Lader – recording engineer (track 12)

Design 

 Reed Bennett - design
 Bryan Rivera - design
 Allen Chiu - design
 Amanda Charchian - photography
 Meagan Judkins - visual producer

Charts

Weekly charts

Year-end charts

Release history

References

External links
 

2019 albums
James Blake (musician) albums
Albums produced by Metro Boomin
Polydor Records albums
Republic Records albums
Albums produced by Allen Ritter
Albums produced by James Blake (musician)
Pop albums by English artists
Electropop albums
Hip hop albums by English artists